Ignațiu Darabant, O.S.B.M. (26 October 1738 – 31 October 1805) was a Romanian Greek Catholic hierarch. He was bishop of the Romanian Catholic Eparchy of Oradea Mare from 1789 to 1805.

Born in Vicea, Maramureș, Habsburg monarchy (present day – Romania) in 1738, he was ordained a priest on June 1765 as a member of the Order of Saint Basil the Great. He was appointed the Bishop by the Holy See on 30 March 1789. He was consecrated to the Episcopate on 13 March 1790. The principal consecrator was Bishop Ioan Bob.

He died in Oradea (present day – Romania) on 31 October 1805.

References 

1738 births
1805 deaths
People from Ulmeni, Maramureș
Romanian Greek-Catholic bishops
18th-century Eastern Catholic bishops
19th-century Eastern Catholic bishops
Order of Saint Basil the Great